Siliștea may refer to several places in Romania:

 Siliștea, Brăila, a commune in Brăila County
 Siliștea, Constanța, a commune in Constanța County
 Siliștea, Teleorman, a commune in Teleorman County
 Siliștea Gumești, a commune in Teleorman County
 Siliștea, a village in Căteasca Commune, Argeș County
 Siliștea, a village in Mileanca Commune, Botoșani County
 Siliștea, a village in Stăuceni Commune, Botoșani County
 Siliștea, a village in Valea Argovei Commune, Călărași County
 Siliștea, a village in Raciu Commune, Dâmbovița County
 Siliștea, a village in Runcu Commune, Dâmbovița County
 Siliștea, a village in Umbrărești Commune, Galați County
 Siliștea, a village in Români Commune, Neamț County
 Siliștea, a village in Tătaru Commune, Prahova County
 Siliștea, a district in the town of Liteni, Suceava County
 Siliștea, a village in Vitănești Commune, Teleorman County
 Siliștea, a village in Iana Commune, Vaslui County
 Siliștea, a village in Pungești Commune, Vaslui County
 Siliștea, a village in Todirești Commune, Vaslui County
 Siliștea Nouă, a district in the town of Dolhasca, Suceava County
 Siliștea (Morișca), a tributary of the Morișca in Botoșani County
 Siliștea (Țibrin), a tributary of the Țibrin in Constanța County
 Siliștea (Valea Porumbenilor), a tributary of the Valea Porumbenilor in Giurgiu County